Frederick J. Maher is an American drummer, music programmer and record producer.

He was a member of the bands Massacre (1980–81), the Dance, Material, Scritti Politti, and has recorded and toured with Lou Reed. In 1984 he released Basic, an instrumental collaboration album with ex-Voidoids guitarist Robert Quine.

Maher's credits as a producer include Lou Reed's New York (1989), Trip Shakespeare's Across the Universe (1990), Matthew Sweet's Girlfriend (1991), Information Society's self-titled album (1988, which achieved platinum sales status), their 1990 album Hack, and a track on 1997's Don't Be Afraid. Maher co-produced Lloyd Cole's self-titled debut solo album.

Maher regularly works as a studio drummer, and he has often collaborated with entertainment producer Ron Baldwin.

Discography

Solo
 Basic (1984, with Robert Quine)

External links

Brief biography + discography
Analog Ears. Universal Audio WebZine, Volume 3, Number 2, April 2005.

1964 births
Living people
Record producers from New York (state)
E.G. Records artists
Richard Hell and the Voidoids members
Massacre (experimental band) members
Material (band) members
Scritti Politti members
20th-century American drummers
American male drummers
20th-century American male musicians
Deadline (band) members